Marine Kakhidze (born 26 November 1983) is a Georgian footballer who plays as a forward for Women's Championship club KSE Samegrelo. She has played officially for the senior Georgia women's national team.

International career
Kakhidze capped for Georgia at senior level during the 2011 FIFA Women's World Cup qualification – UEFA Group 3, including the 0–15 away loss to Denmark on 24 October 2009 (biggest defeat in the Georgia women's national football team history), and during the UEFA Women's Euro 2017 qualifying Group 6, in a 0–3 home loss to Switzerland on 15 September 2016.

References

1983 births
Living people
Women's association football forwards
Women's footballers from Georgia (country)
Georgia (country) women's international footballers